Stade um Bëchel is a football stadium in Hautcharage, in south-western Luxembourg.

It is currently the home stadium of UN Käerjeng 97.  The stadium has a capacity of 1,000.

References

External links
World Stadiums - Luxembourg

Bechel